Al-Faisaliah City  is one of the major development projects in Makkah Al-Mukarramah region that was revealed by Prince Khaled Al-Faisal, Governor of Makkah Al-Mukarramah Province in July 2017. The project is located in the western part of the Kingdom of Saudi Arabia, between the cities of Jeddah and Makkah Al-Mukarramah. The project consists of seven phases, starting with the first phase in In 2019 AD, the project will be completed in 2050 AD, with an estimated area of 2354 km². It is expected to start building five sites within the first phase as a starting point for the project, which includes a commercial port, a yacht marina, a commercial area, a tourist area and a residential neighborhood. With the public transport project in Makkah, Jeddah transportation and the Haramain Express train, the general plan was designed to be ready for the work of special railway projects, consisting of 4 elements, including light trains, collective trains, trams and marine taxis. Al Faisaliyah will be a major stopping point for the West Coast Train Project, which links Jeddah with Jazan with a length of 660. How much does the Ministry of Transport intend to implement during 2025-2030, Al-Faisaliah will contain, next to the train network, an air airport for regional flights And logistic services and the airport wholly owned by King Abdulaziz International Airport.

Al-Faisaliah location 
The land of Al-Faisaliah is located in the south of the city of Jeddah on an area of 2354 km². It is bordered on the north by the Bahra Mountains, on the south by the “Shuaiba desalination plant and the generation of electric power”, on the east side, it is bordered by a series of high mountain and the gate of Makkah, and from the west the second and third industrial city and the shores of the Red Sea.

Timeline 
Implementation start: January 1, 2019

End of implementation: December 31, 2050

Al Faisaliah Components 

 cultural center
 Diplomatic Quarter
 port
 Technology Complex
 Academic District
 agricultural area
 Residential Village
 Pilgrims reception center
 public transport station
 Residential District
 Central District
 Al Faisaliah Airport
 Resorts area
 sport City
 industrial city
 food distribution area
 Islamic Studies District
 private area

See also 

 Red Sea Project
 Al Faisaliyah Center
 Qiddiya
 Neom

References

External links 
Makkah’s Al-Faisaliah project to be unveiled at Jeddah property show

A New Airport to be Opened in Al-Faisaliah

Planned cities in Saudi Arabia
Populated places in Tabuk Province
Proposed populated places
Proposed special economic zones
Economy of Saudi Arabia
2017 establishments in Saudi Arabia
Public Investment Fund